Ludwig Martin (17 February 1858, Munich 10,December 1924 München-Purkheim was a German entomologist.

Ludwig Martin was a physician in Palu.

He collected and studied butterflies in Sumatra (1882 and 1895), South Celebes (1906), West Borneo (1909/10) and Central-Celebes

Works
Partial list:
Nicéville, L. & Martin, L., 1896. A list of the butterflies of Sumatra with especial reference to the species occurring in the north-east of the island. Journal of the Asiatic Society of Bengal [II] 64 :357-555.
Martin, L., 1914-1920. Die Tagfalter der Insel Celebes. Deutsche Entomologische Zeitschrift Iris, Dresden 28: 59-107; 29: 4-19, 50-90; 33: 48-98; 34: 181-210.
Martin, L., 1920-1924. Die Tagfalter der Insel Celebes. Eine kritische Studie mit einigen Neubeschreibungen.Tijdschrift voor Entomologie 63: 111-159; 67: 32-116.
Martin, L., 1929. Die Tagfalter der Insel Celebes. Mitteilungen der Münchner Entomologischen Gesellschaft 19: 117-164 (Teil 8: Satyriden), 371-380 (Fam. Amathusiidae).

References
 Groll, E. K. (Hrsg.): Biografien der Entomologen der Welt : Datenbank. Version 4.15 : Senckenberg Deutsches Entomologisches Institut, 2010 
Rosen, K. von 1925: [Martin, L.] Iris 39 : 5-10		
Dierl, W.; Hausmann, A. 1992: Die Sektion Lepidoptera der Zoologischen Staatssammlung München. Spixiana Suppl., München 17 : 101-107

German lepidopterists
1924 deaths
1858 births